The 2006–07 Northern Football League season was the 109th in the history of Northern Football League, a football competition in England.

Division One

Division One featured 18 clubs which competed in the division last season, along with four new clubs.
 Clubs promoted from Division Two:
 Consett
 Darlington Railway Athletic
 Northallerton Town
 Plus:
 Bishop Auckland, relegated from the Northern Premier League

League table

Division Two

Division Two featured 16 clubs which competed in the division last season, along with five new clubs.
 Clubs relegated from Division One:
 Brandon United
 Esh Winning
 Thornaby
 Plus:
 Stokesley Sports Club, joined from the Wearside Football League
 Team Northumbria, joined from the Northern Football Alliance

Also, Kennek Ryhope CA changed name to Sunderland RCA.

League table

References

External links
 Northern Football League official site

Northern Football League seasons
9